The newton (symbol: N) is the unit of force in the International System of Units (SI). It is defined as 1 kg⋅m/s, the force which gives a mass of 1 kilogram an acceleration of 1 metre per second per second. It is named after Isaac Newton in recognition of his work on classical mechanics, specifically Newton's second law of motion.

Definition
A newton is defined as 1 kg⋅m/s (it is a derived unit which is defined in terms of the SI base units). One newton is therefore the force needed to accelerate one kilogram of mass at the rate of one metre per second squared in the direction of the applied force.
The units "metre per second squared" can be understood as measuring a rate of change in velocity per unit of time, i.e. an increase in velocity by 1 metre per second every second.

In 1946, the Conférence Générale des Poids et Mesures (CGPM) Resolution 2 standardized the unit of force in the MKS system of units to be the amount needed to accelerate 1 kilogram of mass at the rate of 1 metre per second squared. In 1948, the 9th CGPM Resolution 7 adopted the name newton for this force. The MKS system then became the blueprint for today's SI system of units.

In more formal terms, Newton's second law of motion states that the force exerted on an object is directly proportional to the acceleration hence acquired by that object, thus:
 
where  represents the mass of the object undergoing an acceleration . As a result, the newton may be defined in terms of the kilogram, metre, and second as

Examples

At average gravity on Earth (conventionally), a kilogram mass exerts a force of about 9.8 newtons. 
An average-sized apple (or an Apple iPhone 14 Plus) at 200 g, exerts about two newtons of force at Earth's surface, which we measure as the apple's weight on Earth.
0.200 kg × 9.80665 m/s2 = 1.961N.
An average adult exerts a force of about 608 N.
 62 kg × 9.80665 m/s2 = 608 N (where 62 kg is the world average adult mass).

Kilonewtons

It is common to see forces expressed in kilonewtons (kN), where . For example, the tractive effort of a Class Y steam train locomotive and the thrust of an F100 jet engine are both around 130 kN.

 1 kN = 102 kg × 9.81 m/s2.

So for example, a platform that shows it is rated at  will safely support a  load.

Specifications in kilonewtons are common in safety specifications for:
 the holding values of fasteners, Earth anchors, and other items used in the building industry;
 working loads in tension and in shear;
 rock-climbing equipment;
 thrust of rocket engines, Jet engines and launch vehicles;
 clamping forces of the various moulds in injection-moulding machines used to manufacture plastic parts.

Conversion factors

See also

 Force gauge
 International System of Units (SI)
 Joule, SI unit of energy, 1 newton exerted over a distance of 1 metre
 Kilogram-force, force exerted by Earth's gravity at sea level on one kilogram of mass
 Kip (unit)
 Pascal, SI unit of pressure, 1 newton acting on an area of 1 square metre
 Orders of magnitude (force)
 Pound (force)
 Sthène
 Newton metre, SI unit of torque

References 

Units of force
SI derived units
Isaac Newton